The 1991 Nippon Professional Baseball season was the 42nd season of operation for the league.

Regular season standings

Central League

Pacific League

Japan Series

See also
1991 Major League Baseball season

References

 
1991 in baseball
1991 in Japanese sport